Supreme Audit Office may refer to:
Supreme Audit Office (Czech Republic)
Supreme Audit Office (Poland)